Mademoiselle Josette, My Woman (French: Mademoiselle Josette ma femme, German: Fräulein Josette - Meine Frau) is a 1926 French-German silent film directed by Gaston Ravel and starring Dolly Davis, Livio Pavanelli and Ágnes Eszterházy. It is based on the 1906 play of the same title by Robert Charvay and Paul Gavault.

It was shot at the Staaken Studios in Berlin and on location in Nice and at Lake Geneva. The film's sets were designed by the art directors Tony Lekain and Hermann Warm.

Cast
 Dolly Davis as Josette
 Livio Pavanelli as André Ternay
 Ágnes Eszterházy as Myrianne
 André Roanne as Joë Jackson
 Sylvio De Pedrelli as Miguel de Paranagua
 Adolphe Engers as Panard 
 Guy Ferrant 
 Hugo Flink 
 Clementine Plessner 
 Eduard von Winterstein 
 Maria West

References

Bibliography
 James L. Limbacher. Haven't I seen you somewhere before?: Remakes, sequels, and series in motion pictures and television, 1896-1978. Pierian Press, 1979.

External links

1926 films
Films of the Weimar Republic
German silent feature films
Films directed by Gaston Ravel
French silent feature films
German films based on plays
French films based on plays
1926 comedy films
French comedy films
German comedy films
German black-and-white films
French black-and-white films
Films shot at Staaken Studios
Films shot in Nice
Pathé films
Silent comedy films
1920s French films
1920s German films